Beigo (Baygo, Baigo, Bego, Beko, Béogé, Beygo) is an extinct East Sudanic language once spoken in Sudan by the Baygo people, numbering some 850 in the late twentieth century. Similar to Darfur Daju, it is classified as part of the Western Daju family of languages.

Bibliography
 Inventaire des etudes linguistiques sur les pays d'Afrique noire d'expression francaise et sur Madagascar,  Daniel Barreteau 1978 
 Sudan notes and records, Volume 21, The Sudan Philosophical Society
 A Thesaurus of African Languages: A Classified and Annotated Inventory of the Spoken Languages of Africa: with an Appendix on Their Written Representation, Mann and Danby, January 1987,  Hans Zell Publishers,

References

Daju languages
Extinct languages of Africa